Julia Krass (born June 7, 1997) is an American freestyle skier. Krass competed in the 2014 Winter Olympics which took place in Sochi, Russia. She came 11th place in the 2014 Winter Olympics in slope style.

She began skiing at age two and a half when her mother would taker her to the Whaleback Mountain in New Hampshire, United States. She joined the Whaleback Mountain youth skiing programme at age nine.

References

External links

Team USA profile for Julia Krass

1997 births
Living people
American female freestyle skiers
Olympic freestyle skiers of the United States
Freestyle skiers at the 2014 Winter Olympics
Sportspeople from New Hampshire
People from Hanover, New Hampshire
21st-century American women